Bradford Perkins may refer to:

 Bradford Perkins (historian) (1925–2008), American historian
 Bradford Perkins (architect) (born 1943), founding partner of Perkins Eastman